Aldersey is a surname. Notable people with the surname include:

Laurence Aldersey (fl. 1581–1586), English explorer
Mary Ann Aldersey (1797–1868), English Christian missionary
Olympia Aldersey (born 1992), Australian rower
Thomas Aldersey (1521/2–1598), English merchant and philanthropist

See also
Hugh Aldersey-Williams (born 1959), English writer and journalist